"Another Lover" is a 1988 song by Giant Steps.

"Another Lover" may also refer to:
 "Another Lover" (Dane Bowers song), 2001
 "Another Lover", 1991 song by The Pasadenas
 "Another Lover", 1992 Bananarama song, B-side to "Last Thing on My Mind"
 "Another Lover", 2001 song by Hear'Say from Popstars
"Another Lover", 1998 song by White Town from Peek & Poke